Olfa Hezami (born 22 November 2000) is a Tunisian fencer. She competed in the women's team sabre event at the 2020 Summer Olympics.

References

External links

2000 births
Living people
Tunisian female sabre fencers
Olympic fencers of Tunisia
Fencers at the 2020 Summer Olympics
Place of birth missing (living people)
21st-century Tunisian women